Craigieburn may refer to the following places:

Craigieburn, Victoria, Australia
Craigieburn, New Zealand
Craigieburn, KwaZulu-Natal, South Africa